is a large Japanese talent agency.

History

It was founded in 1960 as Hori Productions (ホリプロダクション Hori Purodakushon) and changed to its present name in 1990.  Horipro has two locations in the United States: Nashville and Los Angeles.

In the 1970s, one of Hori Productions' most famous stars was singer Momoe Yamaguchi.

In 1989, Horipro purchased the publishing assets of famed rock band Kiss. Next, the company moved on to invest in more catalogs. A year later, HoriPro Entertainment Group opened their first U.S. location in Nashville, Tennessee. Over the years, Horipro's songwriters would go on to write many hits for some of Country music's most recognized voices. 

In the late 1990s, Horipro planned to create a "virtual idol", an electronic rendition using motion capture methods of Kyoko Date. The virtual idol based on Date charted in Tokyo in 1996, and provided inspiration for the character of Idoru in William Gibson's eponymous novel.

In 2006, Horipro's first Los Angeles location opened. The company's catalog has expanded to include over 13,000 songs in each major genre.  HEG's Los Angeles location is in partnership with Horipro Music Academy, a music enrichment school for children.  Additionally, HEG Los Angeles began MusicTaste, a boutique artist development label that is placed within the publishing company.  MusicTaste's artists include Matt Palmer, Dori Caymmi, and more.

Horipro contracted with MediaHorse, an American music licensing and marketing firm, in 2015 for synchronization licensing in the United States. Horipro sold HoriPro Entertainment Group to Mojo Music & Media in 2019.

Notable talents

Female talents 

Rika Adachi
Kazu Ando
Kei Aran
Ineko Arima
Haruka Ayase
Minori Chihara
Kyoko Date
Kyoko Fukada
Shoko Haida
Minami Hinase
Aya Hirayama
Miyuki Imori
Anna Ishibashi
Haruka Ishida (former AKB48)
Satomi Ishihara
Tomomi Itano (former AKB48)
Kazue Itoh
Karen Iwata (former AKB48)
Nagisa Katahira
Tomomi Kasai (former AKB48)
Yuu Kashii
Ibuki Kido
Haruka Kinami
Ruriko Kojima
Erika Mabuchi
Machico
Akira Matsu
Akane Matsunaga
Yurie Midori
Ayame Misaki
Karen Miyama
Miho Miyazaki (AKB48)
Sae Miyazawa (former AKB48 -> SNH48 -> SKE48)
Misaki Momose
Suzuka Morita (former Idoling!!!)
Mao Ichimichi
Seira Nagashima (former Nogizaka46)
Aoi Nakabeppu
Mami Nakamura
Chiharu Niiyama
Yui Ninomiya
Ayaka Ōhashi
Ito Ohno
Megumi Ohori (former AKB48 -> SDN48)
Rin Okabe (AKB48)
Itsumi Osawa
Mai Oshima (former AKB48)
Ayana Sakai
Ikue Sakakibara
Hinako Sano
Hitomi Sato
Sheila
Sawa Suzuki
Azusa Tadokoro
Hitomi Takahashi
Mitsuki Takahata
Naho Toda
Akiko Wada
Suzuran Yamauchi (former AKB48 -> SKE48)
Erii Yamazaki
Yoon Son-ha
Yuka
Mio Yūki
 Nagisa Shimizu
Rin Aira

Male talents 

Tsuyoshi Abe
Motomu Azaki
Bandō Minosuke II
Chen Bolin
Tatsuya Fujiwara
Eiichiro Funakoshi
Yuki Furukawa
Masachika Ichimura
Sosuke Ikematsu
Yuma Ishigaki
Takeshi Kaga
Daisuke Kikuta
Ryo Kimura
Ryota Ozawa
Kin'ya Kitaōji
Gōki Maeda
Tsuyoshi Matsubara
Kenichi Matsuyama
Akiyoshi Nakao
Takurō Ōno
Ryuji Sainei
Shunya Shiraishi
Kenta Suga
Kazuma Suzuki
Ryohei Suzuki
Shinji Takeda
Ryoma Takeuchi
Yoshitaka Tamba
Satoshi Tsumabuki
Shingo Tsurumi
Yasutaka Tsutsui
Asahi Uchida
Jundai Yamada
Kotaro Yoshida

Comedians

Solo
Hori
Hikaru Ijūin
Masanori Ishii
Kick☆
Ijiri Okada

Duo
Bananaman (Osamu Shitara and Yuki Himura)
Summers (Masakazu Mimura and Kazuki Ōtake)
Speed Wagon (Jun Itoda and Kazuhiro Ozawa

Musical artists 
Aidan James
Ami Wajima
Atlantic Starr
Ayumi Shigemori
BEST FRIENDS!
Fake? (through Music Taste)
Fujioka Fujimaki
Liyuu
May'n
Nano
Shigeru Izumiya
Shino
Takumi Mitani

Athletes

Sho Aranami (baseball player)
Yukiya Arashiro (road bicycle racer)
Yuichi Fukunaga (jockey)
Shinjiro Hiyama (former baseball player)
Junichi Inamoto (football player)
Naoya Inoue (professional boxer)
Takuma Inoue (professional boxer)
Takeomi Ito (rugby player)
Shinji Kazama (motorcyclist)
Yusei Kikuchi (baseball player)
Manabu Kitabeppu (former baseball player)
Hirotoshi Kitagawa (former baseball player)
Yu Koshikawa (volleyball player)
Tomoaki Makino (football player)
Karina Maruyama (former football player)
Kenta Matsudaira (table tennis player)
Kazutomo Miyamoto (former baseball player)
Junichi Miyashita (swimmer)
Takeshi Mizuuchi (former football player)
Toshinori Muto (professional golfer)
Motoko Obayashi (former volleyball player)
Shohei Ohtani (baseball player)
Kairi Sane (professional wrestler)
So Taguchi (former baseball player)
Hisanori Takahashi (former baseball player)
Nobuhiro Takeda (former football player)
Dai Takeuchi (football player)
Yoshinori Tateyama (former baseball player)

Others
Kon Arimura (Film critic)
Tatsuya Egawa (Manga artist)
Péter Frankl (Mathematician, street performer)
Fumi Hirano (Voice actress, essayist)
Kiwa Ishii (Announcer)
Shimako Iwai (Writer, adult video director)
Shoji Kokami (Playwright)
Shinichiro Kurimoto (Economist)
Ayako Nishikawa (Doctor)
Takayuki Ohira (Engineer)
Girolamo Panzetta (Essayist)
Mariko Seyama (Announcer)
Kosuke Takahashi (Journalist)
Takashi Yuasa (Lawyer)

Former Horipro artists 
Sei Ashina (died 14 September 2020)
Yuka Ogino (former NGT48, left 31 May 2022)
Miki Sato (retired 30 September 2022)

References

External links 
Horipro (in Japanese)

HoriPro Entertainment Group(USA)
Music Taste, a boutique artist development label of HoriPro Entertainment Group
HoriPro Music Academy
HoriPro International

 
Japanese voice actor management companies
Japanese talent agencies
Companies formerly listed on the Tokyo Stock Exchange